WS-Security is a flexible and feature-rich extension to SOAP to apply security to web services. It is a member of the WS-* family of web service specifications and was published by OASIS. Closely related to WS-Security is WS-Trust, also a WS-* specification and OASIS standard that provides extensions to WS-Security.

The following are WS-Security based products and services:

See also

WS-* Web Service Specifications
Identity management
Identity management systems
List of single sign-on implementations
OASIS (organization)
SAML 2.0
SAML-based products and services
Security Token Service (STS)
Single sign-on
WS-Federation
WS-Trust
Web Services

References

Computer security software
Identity management